10 Ways to End the World, aka Last Days of Man (original title Mänsklighetens sista dagar, literally "The Final Days of Humanity") is a Swedish TV series by Magnus Sjöström documenting catastrophes that could endanger human existence. The series is produced by Sveriges Utbildningsradio (UR) and was aired on Kunskapskanalen (in English: The Knowledge Channel) in December 2010 under the Swedish name Mänsklighetens sista dagar (Last days of Man) and on National Geographic and Arte in 2012. The series was nominated for the Scandinavian TV award, Kristallen, in 2011.

In the form of a top ten list, a set of doomsday scenarios—disasters that have the capacity to wipe out our species—is examined scientifically. The first part deals with threats to humanity from nature's violent forces. The second part deals with various threats that human society has created.

See also
Life After People

External links
 10 Ways to End the World - National Geographic UK

References

2010 Swedish television series debuts
Sveriges Television original programming
Media related to existential risk
Futurology documentaries
Human extinction